The Hoogovens Wijk aan Zee Steel Chess Tournament 1988 was the 50th edition of the Wijk aan Zee Chess Tournament. It was held in Wijk aan Zee in January 1988. The tournament was won by Anatoly Karpov, the first of his two wins.

{| class="wikitable" style="text-align: center;"
|+ 50th Hoogovens tournament, group A, 8–24 January 1988, Wijk aan Zee, Netherlands, Category XIII (2572)
! !! Player !! Rating !! 1 !! 2 !! 3 !! 4 !! 5 !! 6 !! 7 !! 8 !! 9 !! 10 !! 11 !! 12 !! 13 !! 14 !! Total !! TPR !! Place
|-
|-style="background:#ccffcc;"
| 1 || align=left| || 2715 ||  || ½ || 1 || ½ || ½ || ½ || 1 || 0 || ½ || 1 || ½ || 1 || 1 || 1 || 9 || 2702 || 1
|-
| 2 || align="left" | || 2605 || ½ ||  || ½ || 1 || ½ || ½ || ½ || ½ || 1 || ½ || ½ || 1 || 1 || ½ || 8½ || 2679 || 2
|-
| 3 || align="left" | || 2595 || 0 || ½ ||  || ½ || ½ || ½ || ½ || 1 || 0 || ½ || 1 || 1 || 1 || ½ || 7½ || 2627 || 3–4
|-
| 4 || align="left" | || 2560 || ½ || 0 || ½ ||  || ½ || ½ || 0 || 1 || 1 || 1 || 1 || ½ || 0 || 1 || 7½ || 2630 || 3–4
|-
| 5 || align="left" | || 2630 || ½ || ½ || ½ || ½ ||  || 1 || ½ || ½ || ½ || ½ || ½ || ½ || ½ || 0 || 6½ || 2567 || 5–7
|-
| 6 || align="left" | || 2595 || ½ || ½ || ½ || ½ || 0 ||  || ½ || ½ || 1 || ½ || ½ || 0 || 1 || ½ || 6½ || 2570 || 5–7
|-
| 7 || align="left" | || 2475 || 0 || ½ || ½ || 1 || ½ || ½ ||  || ½ || 0 || ½ || ½ || ½ || ½ || 1 || 6½ || 2579 || 5–7
|-
| 8 || align="left" | || 2630 || 1 || ½ || 0 || 0 || ½ || ½ || ½ ||  || 1 || ½ || ½ || ½ || 0 || ½ || 6 || 2538 || 8–10
|-
| 9 || align="left" | || 2470 || ½ || 0 || 1 || 0 || ½ || 0 || 1 || 0 ||  || ½ || ½ || ½ || 1 || ½ || 6 || 2551 || 8–10
|-
| 10 || align="left" | || 2560 || 0 || ½ || ½ || 0 || ½ || ½ || ½ || ½ || ½ ||  || ½ || ½ || ½ || 1 || 6 || 2544 || 8–10
|-
| 11 || align="left" | || 2535 || ½ || ½ || 0 || 0 || ½ || ½ || ½ || ½ || ½ || ½ ||  || ½ || ½ || ½ || 5½ || 2518 || 11–13
|- 
| 12 || align="left" | || 2555 || 0 || 0 || 0 || ½ || ½ || 1 || ½ || ½ || ½ || ½ || ½ ||  || ½ || ½ || 5½ || 2516 || 11–13
|-
| 13 || align="left" | || 2470 || 0 || 0 || 0 || 1 || ½ || 0 || ½ || 1 || 0 || ½ || ½ || ½ ||  || 1 || 5½ || 2523 || 11–13
|-
| 14 || align="left" | || 2610 || 0 || ½ || ½ || 0 || 1 || ½ || 0 || ½ || ½ || 0 || ½ || ½ || 0 ||  || 4½ || 2459 || 14
|}

References

Tata Steel Chess Tournament
1988 in chess
1988 in Dutch sport